Michael Heweton (also Hewetson or Heweston; 1643-1724) was Archdeacon of Armagh from 1693 to 1700.

Hewetson was born in Dublin on 7 July 1643 and educated at Trinity College, Dublin.  He was Chaplain to 
Archbishop Michael Boyle; and held the living at Cloghran. He died unmarried at Ballyshannon in 1724.

Notes

17th-century Irish Anglican priests
18th-century Irish Anglican priests
Archdeacons of Armagh
1724 deaths
Christian clergy from Dublin (city)
Alumni of Trinity College Dublin
1643 births